Killoran is a surname of Irish origin meaning son of a devotee of (Saint) Luaighreann. Spelling variations include; Mac Killoran, Gilloran, Gilleran, O'Giollarain. It could also come from the toponymic Cill Luaighrinn, in this case meaning church of Luaighrinn.

People with this surname
 Niall Killoran, (born 1992), Irish-Japanese footballer
 Colin Killoran (born 1992), Irish-Japanese footballer
 Paddy Killoran (1904–1965), Irish musician
 Patrick Killoran (died 2010), Australian public servant

Anglicised Irish-language surnames